Mary Howe (April 4, 1882 – September 14, 1964) was an American composer and pianist.

Biography

She was born Mary Carlisle in Richmond, Virginia, at the home of her maternal grandparents, and would live most of her life in the Washington, D.C., area. Her father, Calderon Carlisle, was a well known and successful lawyer descended from the Scottish nobility. Her early lessons were with the noted pianist Hermione Seron. By the time she was 18, she was performing publicly and was accepted into Baltimore's Peabody Institute. It was there that she began studying with Richard Burmeister, reaching a high level of accomplishment on the piano. She also studied composition with Gustav Strube, Ernest Hutcheson, and Harold Randolph (1861–1927), and in 1933 went to Paris to study with the famous French pianist Nadia Boulanger.

Shortly thereafter, she started performing with her friend Anne Hull, one of their most notable performances being Mozart's Concerto for Two Pianos. However, she much preferred composition. She notably emulated neo-romanticism, with an unusually open mind for modernism. Her early compositions were almost exclusively for piano. However, she began to develop an interest in themes in nature and American themes, paving the way for some of her most famous orchestral works (which include Sand, Stars, Rock, Three Pieces after Emily Dickinson and "Chain Gang Song" for orchestra and chorus). Her "Chain Gang Song" was especially praised for its lack of femininity; after the chorus and orchestra called her up to bow after its first performance, a man from the audience praised the conductor for the piece and asked why the woman was bowing with the ensemble.

Later in life, Howe developed a passion for composing for the voice, writing many art songs. In support of her country during World War II, she composed vigorous pieces in support of the troops that incorporated the texts of William Blake, which were also written for voice.

She died in 1964 at the age of 82, ten years after the death of her husband, Walter Bruce Howe. They were survived by their three children: Bruce, Calderon, and Molly.

Work list

Choral
Catalina, 1924; Chain Gang Song, 1925; Cavaliers, 1927, unpublished; Laud for Christmas, 1936; Robin Hood's Heart, 1936, unpublished; Spring Pastoral, 1936; Christmas Song, 1939; Song of Palms, 1939; Song of Ruth, 1939; Williamsburg Sunday, 1940; Prophecy, 1943; A Devotion, 1944; Great Land of Mine, 1953; Poem in Praise, 1955, unpublished; The Pavilion of the Lord, 1957, unpublished; Benedictus es Domine, 1960, unpublished; We Praise thee O God, 1962, unpublished

Songs
Old English Lullaby, 1913; Somewhere in France, 1918; Cossack Cradle Song, 1922; Berceuse, 1925; Chanson Souvenir, 1925; O Mistress Mine, 1925; The Prinkin' Leddie, 1925; Reach, 1925; Red Fields of France, 1925; Ma douleur, 1929; Ripe Apples, 1929; There has Fallen a Splendid Tear, 1930; Der Einsame, 1931; Liebeslied, 1931; Mailied, 1931; Schlaflied, 1931; Abendlied, 1932, unpublished; Avalon, 1932; The Little Rose, 1932; The Rag Picker, 1932; The Lake Isle of Innisfree, 1933; Fair Annet's Song, 1934; Herbsttag, 1934
Little Elegy, 1934; Fragment, 1935; Now goes the light, 1935; Velvet Shoes, 1935; Go down Death, 1936; A Strange Story, 1936; Départ, 1938, unpublished; Soit, 1938; Viennese Waltz, 1938; Irish Lullaby, 1939, unpublished; You, 1939; Am Flusse, 1940; Die Götter, 1940; Heute geh' ich, 1940; Die Jahre, 1940; Ich denke dein, 1940; Trocknet nicht, 1940, unpublished; Zweiful, 1940; The Bird's Nest, 1941; General Store, 1941; Horses of Magic, 1941; Song at Dusk, 1941; Traveling, 1941, unpublished; Were I to Die, 1941, unpublished; L'amant des roses, 1942; Mein Herz, 1942; Men, 1942; Nicht mit Engeln, 1942; Hymne, 1943; In Tauris, 1944; Look on this horizon, 1944, unpublished; To the Unknown Soldier, 1944; Lullaby for a Forester's Child, 1945; Rêve, 1945; O Proserpina, 1946; Spring Come not too Soon, 1947; The Christmas Story, 1948; The Bailey and the Bell, 1950; Horses, 1951; Einfaches Lied, 1955, unpublished; My Lady Comes, 1957; Three Hokku, 1958

Other works
Orchestral: Poema, 1922; Stars, 1927 (New York, 1963); Sand, 1928 (New York, 1963); Castellana, 2 pianos, orchestra, 1930; Dirge, 1931; Axiom, 1932; American Piece, 1933; Coulennes, 1936; Potomac River, 1940; Paean, 1941; Agreeable Overture, 1948; Rock, 1954 (New York, 1963); The Holy Baby of the Madonna, 1958

Chamber music: Fugue, string quartet, 1922; Violin Sonata, D, 1922 (New York, 1962); Ballade Fantasque, 1927; 3 Restaurant Pieces, 1927; Little Suite, string quartet, 1928; Piano Quintet, 1928; Suite mélancolique, 1931; Patria, 1932; Quatuor, string quartet, 1939; 3 Pieces after Emily Dickinson, string quartet, 1941; Interlude between 2 Pieces, flute, piano, 1942; Wind Quintet, 1957

Piano: (published unless otherwise stated): Andante douloureux, 1910; Nocturne, 1913 (New York, 1925); Prelude, 1920; Valse dansante, 2 pianos, 1922, unpublished; Berceuse, 1924 (New York, 1925); Estudia brillante, 1925, unpublished; 3 Spanish Folk Tunes, 2 pianos, 1925 (New York, 1926); Whimsy, 1931; Stars, 1934; Trifle, 1935, unpublished; Cards, ballet, 2 pianos, 1936, unpublished; Le jongleur de Notre Dame, ballet, 2 pianos, 1959, unpublished

Organ: Elegy, 1939, published; For a Wedding, 1940, unpublished

Also transcriptions of works by J. S. Bach for 1 and 2 pianos

Discography
 Music by Mary Howe (1998) – performed by John Martin, Mary Howe, William Strickland, and Catholic University of America Chamber Arts Society, Performed by Tokyo Imperial Philharmonic Orchestra and Vienna Philharmonic
 Love's Seasons: Songs of Mary Howe and Robert Ward (2004) by Sandra McClain and Margo Garrett
 Stars (1927) – Hans Kindler and the National Symphony Orchestra of Washington, D.C., on 29 January 1941 for RCA Victor (78rpm: 11-8608) and reissued on CD in 1999 (Biddulph WHL 063).
 Songs and Duets (2021) – Courtney Maina (soprano), Christopher Leach (tenor), Mary Dibbern (piano), Toccata Classics TOCC0634
 Between Us: Music for Two by Mary Howe (2022) – includes the Violin Sonata (1922), and Ballade Fantastique, Three Restaurant Pieces, Partita, Merles de Coulenne, Interlude between Two Pieces, various performers, Navona NV6432

Sources

Profile, Bach-Cantatas.com
 Dorothy Indenbaum, Carol J. Oja: "Howe, Mary", Grove Music Online

External links
 Mary Howe Papers, 1884–1972 Music Division, New York Public Library for the Performing Arts
 Mary Howe collection of noncommercial recordings, 1945–1955, Rodgers and Hammerstein Archives of Recorded Sound, New York Public Library for the Performing Arts

American women classical composers
American classical composers
Composers for piano
American classical pianists
American women classical pianists
American women singer-songwriters
1882 births
1964 deaths
Musicians from Richmond, Virginia
Peabody Institute alumni
Singer-songwriters from Virginia
20th-century American singers
20th-century American women singers
Classical musicians from Virginia
20th-century classical pianists
20th-century American pianists
Singer-songwriters from Washington, D.C.